Willows, sallows and osiers (Salix species) are used as food plants by the larvae (caterpillars) of a large number of Lepidoptera species including the following.

Monophagous species
Species that feed exclusively on Salix.

 Batrachedridae
 Batrachedra salicipomenella
 Coleophoridae
 Several Coleophora case-bearer species:
 C. albidella – only on S. aurita, goat willow (S. caprea), grey willow (S. cinerea) and S. repens
 C. bedella – only on S. excelsa
 C. castipennella
 C. kearfottella
 C. zelleriella
 Geometridae
 Slender pug (Eupithecia tenuiata)
 Hepialidae
 Sthenopis thule
 Nepticulidae
 Ectoedemia intimella
 Noctuidae
 Minor shoulder-knot (Brachylomia viminalis)
 Sesiidae
 Sallow clearwing (Synanthedon flaviventris)
 Tortricidae
 Cydia servillana

Polyphagous species
Species that feed on Salix and other plants.

 Arctiidae
 Giant leopard moth (Ecpantheria scribonia)
 Batrachedridae
 Batrachedra praeangusta
 Batrachedra striolata – recorded on arroyo willow (Salix lasiolepsis)
 Bedelliidae
 Bedellia somnulentella
 Coleophoridae
 Several Coleophora case-bearer species:
 C. anatipennella
 C. atlantica
 C. currucipennella
 C. lusciniaepennella
 C. malivorella

 C. piperata
 C. pruniella – recorded on crack willow (Salix fragilis)
 C. salicivorella
 Geometridae
 Agriopis marginaria (dotted border)
 Alcis repandata (mottled beauty)
 Cabera exanthemata (common wave)
 Cabera pusaria (common white wave)
 Chloroclysta truncata (common marbled carpet)
 Colotois pennaria (feathered thorn)
 Crocallis elinguaria (scalloped oak)
 Ectropis crepuscularia (engrailed)
 Epirrita autumnata (autumnal moth)
 Eupithecia pusillata (juniper pug) – Americas only
 Eupithecia subfuscata (grey pug)
 Eupithecia vulgata (common pug)
 Hemithea aestivaria (common emerald)
 Lomaspilis marginata (clouded border)
 Odontopera bidentata (scalloped hazel)
 Operophtera brumata (winter moth)
 Opisthograptis luteolata (brimstone moth)
 Hepialidae
 Sthenopis argenteomaculatus
 Sthenopis purpurascens
 Lymantriidae
 Euproctis chrysorrhoea (brown-tail)
 Euproctis similis (yellow-tail)
 Lymantria dispar (gypsy moth)
 Nepticulidae
 Stigmella salicis – also found on Myrica gale 
 Noctuidae
 Acronicta leporina (miller)
 Acronicta megacephala (poplar grey)
 Acronicta psi (grey dagger)
 Acronicta tridens (dark dagger)
 Agrochola circellaris (brick) – recorded on common osier (S. viminalis)
 Amphipyra berbera (Svensson's copper underwing)
 Amphipyra tragopoginis (mouse moth)
 Antitype chi (grey chi)
 Catocala cara (darling underwing) – prefers black willow (S. nigra)
 Catocala delilah (Delilah underwing)
 Catocala junctura (joined underwing)
 Cosmia trapezina (dun-bar)
 Diarsia mendica (ingrailed clay)
 Diarsia rubi (small square-spot)
 Eugnorisma glareosa (autumnal rustic)
 Euplexia lucipara (small angle shades)
 Eupsilia transversa (satellite)
 Melanchra persicariae (dot moth)
 Naenia typica (gothic)
 Noctua comes (lesser yellow underwing)
 Noctua janthina (lesser broad-bordered yellow underwing)
 Ochropleura plecta (flame shoulder)
 Orthosia cerasi (common Quaker)
 Orthosia gothica (Hebrew character)
 Xestia triangulum (double square-spot)
 Xestia xanthographa (square-spot rustic)
 Notodontidae
 Furcula bifida (poplar kitten)
 Nadata gibbosa (rough prominent)
 Phalera bucephala (buff-tip)
 Ptilodon capucina (coxcomb prominent)
 Nymphalidae
 Limenitis archippus (viceroy butterfly)
 Limenitis arthemis (American white admiral/red-spotted purple) – recorded on beaked willow (S. bebbiana) and others
 Pyralidae
 Endotricha flammealis
 Saturniidae
 Automeris io (Io moth)
 Pavonia pavonia (emperor moth)
 Sesiidae
 Red-tipped clearwing (Synanthedon formicaeformis)
 Sphingidae
 Laothoe populi (poplar hawk-moth)
 Smerinthus jamaicensis (twin-spotted sphinx)

References

External links

Willows
+Lepidoptera